Jannis Pellowski (born 15 June 1992) is a German footballer who plays as a goalkeeper for FSV Frankfurt.

He made his professional debut for FSV Frankfurt in the first round of the DFB-Pokal against Bundesliga club VfL Wolfsburg on 20 August 2016, losing 1–2.

References

External links
 

German footballers
Association football goalkeepers
FSV Frankfurt players
3. Liga players
Sportspeople from Darmstadt
1992 births
Living people
Footballers from Hesse
21st-century German people